Tomasi is both a surname and a given name. Notable people with the name include:

Surname
Carlos Tomasi (born 1930), Argentine bobsledder
Giuseppe Tomasi di Lampedusa (1896 – 1957), Sicilian writer
St. Giuseppe Maria Tomasi (1649 – 1713), Italian cardinal and saint
Héctor Tomasi, Argentine bobsledder
Henri Tomasi (1901 - 1971), French composer and conductor.
Mari Tomasi (1907-1965), American novelist
Peter Tomasi, American comic book writer
Pietro Tomasi Della Torretta (1873 – 1962), Italian politician and diplomat

Given name
Junior Tomasi Cama, New Zealand Rugby union player
Tomasi Kanailagi, Fijian Methodist minister and political leader
Tomasi Kulimoetoke I, king of Uvea, ruling from 1924 until 1928
Tomasi Kulimoetoke II (1918 – 2007), Lavelua (King) of Wallis Island
Sir Tomasi Puapua (born 1938), politician from Tuvalu
Tomasi Sauqaqa, Fijian politician serving as Assistant Minister for Health from 2001 to 2006
Tomasi Vakatora (1926 – 2006), Fijian politician who served as Speaker of the House of Representatives
Tomasi Vuetilovoni, Fijian politician, current Minister for Tourism and Transport

See also
Tomasi–Kanade factorization
Tomassi (disambiguation)
Tommasi

Surnames from given names
Italian-language surnames
Surnames of South Tyrolean origin